Le Magny is a former commune in the Vosges department in Lorraine in northeastern France. It merged into the commune of Fontenoy-le-Château on 1 January 2013.

Geography
The Côney forms the commune's northern border; a stream called la Becêne, a tributary of the Côney, forms its eastern border.

See also
Communes of the Vosges department

References

Former communes of Vosges (department)